The 1895 Lehigh football team was an American football team that represented Lehigh University as an independent during the 1895 college football season. In its first and only season under head coach Laurie Bliss, the team compiled a 3–6 record and outscored opponents by a total of 134 to 63.

Schedule

References

Lehigh
Lehigh Mountain Hawks football seasons
Lehigh football